Jonathan Wade-Drahos is an American film and television actor who is most famous for his lead role as John Webster in Dirk Shafer's 2001 film Circuit. He also played lead role as Gary in Ryan Bottiglieri's 2010 film Trim.
Jonathan Drahos lived and worked in the UK where he earned a PhD in Drama with an emphasis in Shakespearean and Marlovian minor epic poetry and performance. He is currently an Associate Professor and the Director of Theatre in the department of English, Theatre, and Foreign Languages at University of North Carolina, Pembroke.

Filmography
Films
2001: Circuit as John Webster
2010: Trim as Gary
TV series
2003: American Dreams as an optometrist in episode "Fear Itself"
2003: NCIS: Naval Criminal Investigative Service as Lt. Greg Pallini in episode "The Curse"
2005: Jake in Progress as Richard in episode "Ubusy?"

References

External links

American male film actors
Living people
Year of birth missing (living people)